The 2017–18 season was Ferencvárosi TC's 115th competitive season, 9th consecutive season in the OTP Bank Liga and 118th year in existence as a football club.

Players

First team squad

Out on loan

Transfers

Summer

In:

Out:

Winter

In:

Out:

Statistics

Appearances and goals
Last updated on 2 June 2018.

|-
|colspan="14"|Out to loan:

|-
|colspan="14"|Players no longer at the club:

|}

Top scorers
Includes all competitive matches. The list is sorted by shirt number when total goals are equal.

Last updated on 2 June 2018

Disciplinary record
Includes all competitive matches. Players with 1 card or more included only.

Last updated on 2 June 2018

Overall
{|class="wikitable"
|-
|Games played || 39 (33 OTP Bank Liga, 4 Europa League and 2 Hungarian Cup)
|-
|Games won ||   21 (18 OTP Bank Liga, 2 Europa League and 1 Hungarian Cup)
|-
|Games drawn ||  11 (11 OTP Bank Liga, 0 Europa League and 0 Hungarian Cup)
|-
|Games lost || 6 (3 OTP Bank Liga, 2 Europa League and 1 Hungarian Cup)
|-
|Goals scored || 77
|-
|Goals conceded || 40
|-
|Goal difference || +37
|-
|Yellow cards || 83
|-
|Red cards || 5
|-
|rowspan="1"|Worst discipline ||  Leandro (12 , 0 )
|-
|rowspan="2"|Best result || 5–0 (H) v Mezőkövesd - OTP Bank Liga - 30-07-2017
|-
| 5–0 (H) v Balmazújváros - OTP Bank Liga - 10-03-2017
|-
|rowspan="3"|Worst result || 2–4 (H) v Midtjylland - Europa League - 13-07-2017
|-
| 1–3 (A) v Midtjylland - Europa League - 20-07-2017
|-
| 1–3 (A) v Videoton - OTP Bank Liga - 27-08-2017
|-
|rowspan="1"|Most appearances ||  Dénes Dibusz (37 appearances)
|-
|rowspan="1"|Top scorer ||  Roland Varga (20 goals)
|-
|Points || 75/117 (64.1%)
|-

Nemzeti Bajnokság I

Matches

League table

Results summary

Results by round

Magyar Kupa

Europa League

The First and Second Qualifying Round draws took place at UEFA headquarters in Nyon, Switzerland on 19 June 2017.

References

External links
 Official Website
 UEFA
 fixtures and results

2017-18
Hungarian football clubs 2017–18 season